Stewart Manor is a village in the Town of Hempstead in Nassau County, on Long Island, in New York,  United States. The population was 1,896 at the 2010 census.

History 
Stewart Manor had been called Sunrise Gardens between 1925 and 1927, after a real estate development in the area. Residents changed the name to Stewart Manor in 1927. The name reflects the community's proximity to the Stewart Manor station on the Long Island Rail Road in the adjacent village, Garden City, which is named after Alexander Turney Stewart.

Stewart Manor incorporated as a village in 1927.

Geography

The village is east of the Village of Floral Park, south of the Village of New Hyde Park, and west of Franklin Square, and the Village of Garden City.

Demographics

At the 2000 census there were 1,935 people, 718 households, and 564 families in the village. The population density was 9,784.9 people per square mile (3,735.5/km2). There were 726 housing units at an average density of 3,671.2 per square mile (1,401.6/km2).  The racial makeup of the village was 93.28% White, 1.76% African American, 1.91% Asian, 1.45% from other races, and 1.60% from two or more races. Hispanic or Latino of any race were 4.03%.

Of the 718 households 32.2% had children under the age of 18 living with them, 64.1% were married couples living together, 12.0% had a female householder with no husband present, and 21.4% were non-families. 19.4% of households were one person and 10.6% were one person aged 65 or older. The average household size was 2.69 and the average family size was 3.10.

The age distribution was 23.2% under the age of 18, 6.8% from 18 to 24, 28.6% from 25 to 44, 25.4% from 45 to 64, and 16.0% 65 or older. The median age was 40 years. For every 100 females, there were 84.8 males. For every 100 females age 18 and over, there were 81.6 males.

The median household income was $84,913 and the median family income  was $97,922. Males had a median income of $67,031 versus $41,042 for females. The per capita income for the village was $35,371. About 1.9% of families and 2.6% of the population were below the poverty line, including 3.2% of those under age 18 and 3.9% of those age 65 or over.

Education

School districts 
Stewart Manor is located primarily within the boundaries of the Elmont Union Free School District (K-6) and the Sewanhaka Central High School District (7-12), although the street in the village called Fernwood Terrace is split between Garden City Union Free School District, as well as the Franklin Square UFSD (the latter of which feeds into the Sewanhaka CHSD). As such, children who reside within the village and attend public schools go to school in one of these districts.

Library districts 
Stewart Manor is served by the Elmont, Franklin Square, and Garden City Library Districts. The boundaries of these three library districts roughly correspond with those of the school districts.

Notable person
 Sal Paolantonio (born 1956), Philadelphia-based bureau reporter for ESPN, who primarily reports on NFL stories.

See also

References

External links

 Official website

Hempstead, New York
Villages in New York (state)
Villages in Nassau County, New York